Elkhan Mammadov has joined FIFA as Director Member Associations Europe on April 20, 2022, while remaining a Vice President of AFFA. Before that, he has been the Executive Vice President and the General Secretary of Association of Football Federations of Azerbaijan (AFFA), Project Leader for UEFA EURO 2020 Baku Bid, vice-president of UEFA Fair Play and Social Responsibility Committee, FIFA Fair Play and Social Responsibility Committee Member.

Biography
Elkhan Mammadov was born in 1979 in Baku, Azerbaijan.

Education 
Mammadov received his bachelor's degree in  Business Administration and Corporate Management  from American InterContinental University (London, UK) in 1999.

In 2011 Elkhan Mammadov participated in Football Clubs and Association's Management Executive Training conducted by University of Liverpool. He also completed his postgraduate studies in Planning Management at University of Salford (Manchester, UK) in 2012.

In 2016 Elkhan Mammadov graduated from The Executive Master in European Sport Governance (MESGO) programme, organized in cooperation with Sciences Po institute in Paris.

He also completed Harvard Business School's online Management Essentials course.

Career
Worked as logistical operations controller's assistant in Baku Investment Ltd  in 1996–1997. Upon graduation from American InterContinental University, worked as deputy director at Natavan Business Centre and then, managing director at Natavan Company and Baku Investment Ltd. In 2000–2008.

AFFA 
Elkhan Mammadov is currently the Executive Vice President (since January, 2020) of AFFA. He became the General Secretary of AFFA in July 2007. Currently, Mammadov also holds the title of  Vice President at UEFA Fair Play and Social Responsibility Committee (since 2008) and is a member of FIFA Fair Play and Social Responsibility Committee. He performed as UEFA Delegate during 2009–2012.

Mammadov was a member and a chairman of various bidding committees for Azerbaijan to host international sporting events. Under his chairmanship, Azerbaijan received the right to host 2012 FIFA Under-17 Women’s World Cup,  2016 UEFA Under-17 European Championship and most lately, three group stage and one quarter-final matches of EURO 2020, that was announced by UEFA in September 2014.

Upon taking office as AFFA General Secretary, Mammadov initiated reformation of Association structure – which resulted in such new departments as Registration and Statistics, Women's Leagues, Information Technologies, and others – and facilitated adoption of AFFA strategy with three defined priorities: Education, Infrastructure and Grassroots.

In 2013 AFFA received  Women and Sport Achievement Diploma from International Olympic Committee for its contribution to the development and popularization of women's and girls' football.

In 2014 AFFA together with its partner, Bakcell, started cooperation with Manchester United Football Club: young football players receive a chance to train with coaches of one of the leading football clubs in the world.

Mammadov was appointed for the third consecutive term as General Secretary by President Rovnag Abdullayev and executive committee  at AFFA Congress in Spring 2016.

In September 2016, AFFA adopted new development strategy “GROW 2020”, which highlights Association's priorities until 2020/21 football season.

On October 4, 2016, Elkhan Mammadov received a Leadership Award at “Leaders Under 40 Awards” event in London.

On February 9, 2017, Elkhan Mammadov was announced as one of 13 candidates from UEFA member associations standing for the eight vacant positions on the UEFA Executive Committee for the elections at 41st Ordinary UEFA Congress in early April, for which he presented the candidate brochure.

On December 18, 2017, President of Azerbaijan Republic Ilham Aliyev presented Elkhan Mammadov with the Azerbaijani President's honorary diploma.

Besides his native Azerbaijani, he is fluent in English, Russian and Turkish.

Married with three children, including Jamal Mammadov, a u-16 footballer.

References

External links
 https://web.archive.org/web/20150512145118/http://www.baku2015.com/

1979 births
Association of Football Federations of Azerbaijan
Businesspeople from Baku
Living people